Levente Bozsik  (born 22 April 1980) is a Hungarian former professional footballer who played for several clubs in Europe as a striker.

Career
Bozsik played for BVSC Budapest in Hungary, 1. FC Union Berlin, SC Fortuna Köln and FC Carl Zeiss Jena in the German Regionalliga and FC KooTeePee in the Finnish Veikkausliiga.

References

1980 births
Living people
Hungarian footballers
Hungarian expatriate footballers
Association football forwards
Nemzeti Bajnokság I players
Regionalliga players
Veikkausliiga players
Cypriot First Division players
Budapesti VSC footballers
1. FC Union Berlin players
SC Fortuna Köln players
FC Carl Zeiss Jena players
FC KooTeePee players
Anagennisi Deryneia FC players
Hungarian expatriate sportspeople in Germany
Expatriate footballers in Germany
Hungarian expatriate sportspeople in Finland
Expatriate footballers in Finland
Hungarian expatriate sportspeople in Cyprus
Expatriate footballers in Cyprus
Footballers from Budapest